Grevillea costata is a species of flowering plant in the family Proteaceae and is endemic to the west of Western Australia. It is a spreading shrub with sharply-pointed, linear leaves and white flowers.

Description

Taxonomy
Grevillea costata was first formally described in 1974 by Alex George in the journal Nuytsia from specimens collected by Charles Gardner near rocks in the Murchison River in 1931. The specific epithet (costata) means "ribbed", referring to the fruit.

Distribution and habitat
This grevillea grows in sand and among rocks in the river bed of the Murchison River in the Carnarvon, Geraldton Sandplains and Yalgoo biogeographic region of Western Australia.

Conservation status
Grevillea costata is listed as "Priority Three" by the Government of Western Australia Department of Biodiversity, Conservation and Attractions, meaning that it is poorly known and known from only a few locations but is not under imminent threat.

See also
 List of Grevillea species

References

costata
Proteales of Australia
Eudicots of Western Australia
Plants described in 1974
Taxa named by Alex George